Steffen Horpestad (born 25 February 1975) is a Norwegian former footballer who played as a midfielder. Horpestad played in three Tippeligaen matches for Viking FK. In 2006, he married footballer Ane Stangeland Horpestad.

References

External links 
 Profile at Norwegian Football Association (NFF) 

1975 births
Living people
Norwegian footballers
Viking FK players
Bryne FK players

Association football midfielders